Piotr Hallmann (born 25 August 1987 in Gdynia) is a Polish mixed martial artist and second lieutenant in the Polish Navy. Hallmann has fought as a lightweight throughout his MMA career, and competed for the Ultimate Fighting Championship.

He is currently fights in the lightweight division of the Absolute Championship Berkut.

Biography
Hallmann was born in Gdynia, Poland on August 25, 1987. He is the first professional athlete from his family. He had shown interest in martial arts at a very young age, when he had started training karate at the age of six. His other athletic pursuits included football and capoeira. He had started training in mixed martial arts in 2008, and made his professional debut one year later.

He trains at Mighty Bulls Gdynia under Grzegorz Jakubowski.

Hallmann graduated from Akademia Marynarki Wojennej and is currently an officer of the Navy, with the rank of Secondary Lieutenant.

Mixed martial arts career

Early career
Hallmann had made his professional debut at "Beast of the East" event in his hometown, Gdynia, on November 14, 2009, when he defeated Krzysztof Adaszak. After three consecutive wins, he suffered his first career defeat against a German fighter, Christian Eckerlin.

Following that loss, Hallmann collected nine consecutive wins at various European events. He won Casino Fight Night 2011 tournament in Erfurt, as well as World Freefight Challenge and Celtic Gladiator lightweight championship titles.

Ultimate Fighting Championship
Following his series of wins on European circuit, Hallmann had signed a four-fight deal with the Ultimate Fighting Championship

Hallmann first competed on the UFC Fight Night: Teixeira vs. Bader card, which took place on September 4, 2013 in Brazil.  He faced Brazilian fighter Francisco Trinaldo and scored a comeback win by kimura in the second round, after getting repeatedly hurt by kicks to the body in the first round. This performance had earned him a $50,000 Submission of the Night bonus award.

Hallmann faced Al Iaquinta on October 26, 2013 at UFC Fight Night: Machida vs. Munoz. He lost the fight via unanimous decision.

In his highest profile fight with the promotion to date, Hallmann faced Yves Edwards at UFC Fight Night 42 on June 7, 2014. He won the fight via rear-naked choke submission in the third round.  The win also earned Hallmann his first Performance of the Night bonus award.

Hallman next faced Gleison Tibau on September 13, 2014 at UFC Fight Night 51. He lost the back-and-forth fight via split decision.  Despite the loss on the scorecards, Hallman was awarded a bonus for Fight of the Night.  However, Hallman tested positive during a post fight drug screening for drostanolone.  In turn, Hallmann was suspended for nine months and his bonus award was rescinded.

Hallman faced promotional newcomer Magomed Mustafaev on June 20, 2015 at UFC Fight Night 69. He lost the fight via TKO in the second round, after the referee stopped the contest on the advice of the doctor due to a large cut over Hallman's left eye.

Hallman faced Alex Oliveira on November 7, 2015 at UFC Fight Night 77. He lost the back-and-forth bout via knockout in the third round and was subsequently released from the promotion.

Absolute Championship Berkut

Hallmann faced Adrian Zielinski on July 1, 2017 at ACB 63. He won the fight via split decision.

Championships and accomplishments

Mixed martial arts
Ultimate Fighting Championship
Fight of the Night (One time) vs. Gleison Tibau
Performance of the Night (One time) vs. Yves Edwards
Submission of the Night (One time) vs. Francisco Trinaldo

Mixed martial arts record 

|- 
| Win
| align=center|18–6
| Adrian Zielinski
| Decision (split)
| ACB 63
| 
| align=center|3
| align=center|5:00
| Gdańsk, Poland
|
|-
| Win
| align=center|17–6
| Patryk Nowak
| Decision (unanimous)
| FEN 17
| 
| align=center|3
| align=center|5:00
| Gdynia, Poland
|
|-
| Loss
| align=center|16–6
| Kamil Łebkowski
| Decision (unanimous)
| FEN 12
| 
| align=center|3
| align=center|5:00
| Gdynia, Poland
|
|- 
| Win
| align=center|16–5
| Jason Ponet
| Decision (split)
| Slavia Republic 1
| 
| align=center|3
| align=center|5:00
| Gdynia, Poland
|
|-
| Loss
| align=center|15–5
| Alex Oliveira
| KO (punch)
| UFC Fight Night: Belfort vs. Henderson 3
| 
| align=center|3
| align=center|0:54
| São Paulo, Brazil
|
|-
| Loss
| align=center| 15–4
| Magomed Mustafaev
| TKO (doctor stoppage)
| UFC Fight Night: Jędrzejczyk vs. Penne
| 
| align=center| 2
| align=center| 3:24
| Berlin, Germany
|
|-
| Loss
| align=center| 15–3
| Gleison Tibau
| Decision (split)
| UFC Fight Night: Bigfoot vs. Arlovski
| 
| align=center| 3
| align=center| 5:00
|Brasília, Brazil
|
|-
| Win
| align=center| 15–2
| Yves Edwards
| Submission (rear-naked choke)
| UFC Fight Night: Henderson vs. Khabilov
| 
| align=center| 3
| align=center| 2:31
| Albuquerque, New Mexico, United States
| 
|-
| Loss
| align=center| 14–2
| Al Iaquinta
| Decision (unanimous)
| UFC Fight Night: Machida vs. Munoz
| 
| align=center| 3
| align=center| 5:00
| Manchester, England
|
|-
| Win
| align=center| 14–1
| Francisco Trinaldo
| Submission (kimura)
| UFC Fight Night: Teixeira vs. Bader
| 
| align=center| 2
| align=center| 3:50
| Belo Horizonte, Brazil
| 
|-
| Win
| align=center| 13–1
| Juha-Pekka Vainikainen
| Decision (unanimous)
| MMA Attack 3
| 
| align=center| 3
| align=center| 5:00
| Katowice, Poland
|
|-
| Win
| align=center| 12–1
| Ivica Truscek
| Submission (rear-naked choke)
| Celtic Gladiator VI
| 
| align=center| 2
| align=center| 2:03
| Saggart, Ireland
| 
|-
| Win
| align=center| 11–1
| Vaso Bakočević
| TKO (doctor stoppage)
| WFC 17: Olimp Live & Fight
| 
| align=center| 2
| align=center| 0:47
| Ljubljana, Slovenia
| 
|-
| Win
| align=center| 10–1
| Jarkko Latomaki
| TKO (punches)
| Botnia Punishment 12
| 
| align=center| 1
| align=center| 4:02
| Seinajoki, Finland
|
|-
| Win
| align=center| 9–1
| Kevin Donnelly
| Submission (rear-naked choke)
| Cage Warriors Fight Night 5
| 
| align=center| 3
| align=center| 4:10
| Amman, Jordan
|
|-
| Win
| align=center| 8–1
| Szymon Walaszek
| Submission (rear-naked choke)
| Round 1
| 
| align=center| 1
| align=center| 2:18
| Białogard, Poland
|
|-
| Win
| align=center| 7–1
| Tamirlan Dadajew
| Submission (rear-naked choke)
| Casino Fight Night 2
| 
| align=center| 1
| align=center| 11:23
| Erfurt, Germany
| 
|-
|Win
| align=center| 6–1
| Avtandil Shoshiashvili
| KO (punch)
| Casino Fight Night 2
| 
| align=center| 1
| align=center| 0:12
| Erfurt, Germany
|
|-
| Win
| align=center| 5–1
| Rastislav Hanulay
| Submission (rear-naked choke)
| Ring XF 3: Double Battle
| 
| align=center| 2
| align=center| 4:08
|Zgierz, Poland
|
|-
| Loss
| align=center| 4–1
| Christian Eckerlin
| TKO (retirement)
| GMC 2: Continued
| 
| align=center| 4
| align=center| 0:51
| Herne, Germany
|
|-
| Win
| align=center| 4–0
| Kerim Abzaiłow
| KO (punches)
| RING XF 2: Second Coming
| 
|  align=center| 1
| align=center| 2:47
| Łódź, Poland
|
|-
| Win
| align=center| 3–0
| Rafał Terlikowski
| TKO (punches)
| Shooto Poland: Polish Shooto League 9
| 
| align=center| 1
| align=center| 1:42
| Przodkowo, Poland
|
|-
| Win
| align=center| 2–0
| Paweł Wołowiec
| TKO (punches)
| Shooto Poland: Held vs. Lasota
| 
| align=center| 1
| align=center| 2:15
| Kielce, Poland
|
|-
| Win
| align=center| 1–0
| Krzysztof Adaszak
| TKO (punches)
| Beast of the East
| 
| align=center| 1
| align=center| 2:49
| Gdynia, Poland
|

See also
 List of current UFC fighters
 List of male mixed martial artists

References

External links 
 
 

1987 births
Polish male mixed martial artists
Mixed martial artists utilizing karate
Mixed martial artists utilizing capoeira
Polish male karateka
Polish capoeira practitioners
Living people
Sportspeople from Gdynia
Polish Navy officers
Ultimate Fighting Championship male fighters